The 2013 FAI Senior Challenge Cup, also known as the 2013 FAI Ford Senior Cup, was the 93rd season of the national football competition of the Republic of Ireland. The winners of the competition earned a spot in the first qualifying round of the 2014-15 UEFA Europa League.

A total of 40 teams are competing in the 2013 competition, which commenced on the weekend ending on 31 March 2013. The teams entered from the 2013 League of Ireland Premier Division and First Division received byes into the second round stage. Four non-league clubs also received byes to the second round. The remaining 12 teams entered at the first round stage. These non-league teams are composed of the sixteen clubs, which reached the fourth round of the 2012–13 FAI Intermediate Cup and the seni-finalists of the FAI Junior Cup 2012-13.

Teams

First round
The draw for this round was conducted by FAI President Paddy McCaul at the FAI headquarters in Abbotstown on 5 March 2013. 16 of the 20 non-League of Ireland clubs are participating in this round, with the remaining 4 clubs earning a bye to the second round. The matches were played on the weekend ending 31 March 2013.

First round Replays

Second round

The draw for the second round was made live on Monday Night Soccer on 29 April. The draw was made by FAI President Paddy McCaul and Nicky Byrne, a former international goalkeeper for Republic of Ireland youth sides and former member of the boy band Westlife.

Second round Replays

Third round
The draw for the third round was made live on Monday Night Soccer on 15 July. The draw was made by FAI President Paddy McCaul and Republic of Ireland U19 team manager Paul Doolin.

Third round Replays

Quarter-finals
The draw for the quarter finals was made on 26 August on Monday Night Soccer. The draw was made by FAI President Paddy McCaul and former goalkeeper Alan O'Neill who won the FAI Cup with Shamrock Rovers, Dundalk and UCD. Fixtures took place on the weekend of 15 September 2013.

Quarter-finals replays

Semi-finals
The draw for the semi finals was made on 16 September on Monday Night Soccer. The draw was made by the Director of the Airtricity League Fran Gavin and former Irish national player Turlough O'Connor. Fixtures took place on the weekend of 6 October 2013. Both matches were shown live on RTÉ Two.

Final

References

 
FAI Cup seasons
2